Abdus Salam (1925 – 2 July 1992) was a Pakistani newscaster at Radio Pakistan and Pakistan Television. He was posthumously granted the Pride of Performance Award in 1993.

Life and career
Salam was born to a lower middle-class family in 1925 in Ajmer Sharif, British India. He migrated to Pakistan after the Indo-Pak Independence.

Initially, he joined Radio Pakistan, Hyderabad, as a technical operator. But later, he became successful as a news reader. He also worked for Pakistan Television as an Urdu news presenter from 1977 to 1989.

Death
On 29 June 1992, Salam was hit by a motorcycle when he was leaving the Radio Pakistan station for home after recording the night's news bulletin. Due to severe injuries, he died on 2 July 1992, after remaining 2 days in a coma.

Awards and recognition
 Salam received the Nigar Award for best newscaster in 1988.
 Salam was posthumously awarded the Pride of Performance in 1993.
 After his accidental death, Radio Pakistan added a recording of his opening voice as a permanent part of its main bulletin to pay a tribute to his services in the field of broadcasting.

References

1925 births
1992 deaths
Pakistani television people
Recipients of the Pride of Performance
Pakistani television newsreaders and news presenters
Pakistani radio people
People from Ajmer